Patones is a Spanish municipality in the region of the Comunidad de Madrid situated partly in the valley of the river Jarama and partly in the foothills of the Sierra de Guadarrama mountain range.

Although small, the town has its own council, and consists of two distinct settlements: The ancient hillside village (Upper) Patones Arriba and the modern (Lower) Patones Abajo on the plain below.

Altitude: 834 m
Extension: 35 km²
Distance from Madrid: 60 km
Population (in 1999) 368

According to an 18th-century travelogue quoted below, the name is believed to originate from the family name of the first settlers Patón, who were, reputedly refugees from Muslim invaders who established a private Christian Kingdom of Patones Alternatively, since  Iberian languages are of Latin origin the name may simply be derived from  patricius.

Patones Abajo

The area around Patones is a major water catchment zone with  extensive storage reservoirs and pumping stations  operated by the company Canal de Isabel II which is the principal water utility for both the city and the region of Madrid.

As mechanized transport grew in importance around  the mid 20th century, a more accessible settlement was established on the plain below the original village, hence the name Patones Abajo (Lower Patones)

Although the schools and administration buildings in the old village were then of fairly recent construction, new facilities were created in the new settlement. (Upper) Patones Arriba  was finally abandoned in the mid-1960s.

In the 1990s the historical value of the old village and the potential for hill-sports was appreciated, and the old settlement was extensively rehabilitated. Facilities for rural education, cultural tourism, and sports-recreation were established. At the same time, day facilities for visitors and short-stay accommodation was also amplified and improved to meet modern technical standards.

A Rural Telecentre CENIT was established in 2002 to enhance to local economic development, and offer modern services in new technologies to the local population and business community.

The single-track road No. M912 to the Patones Arriba is heavily used by sports-cyclists, and motor-vehicle access has been severely restricted both for road-safety and environmental protection reasons. In 2011 a free micro-bus service between Patones Abajo and Patones Arriba was initiated as an experiment, principally  to facilitate access for tourists and hotel guests.

Patones Arriba

Patones Arriba  existed some time before 1527, when its inhabitants were required to repair a bridge .

It is next mentioned in a census of 1555 when seven residents are recorded. In 1687 it became attached to the nearby town of Uceda, and the first record of the King of Patones dates from about this time.

In the 17th century it appears to have been the property of The Marquise of Ensenada, and at one time was owned by the Bishop of Toledo.

The King of Patones
The Kings of Patones were hereditary sages, and fulfilled the functions of mayor and justice of the peace. They governed the town until 1750 when the last incumbent moved to Madrid. There is an account of this role written in 1781 by  Don Antonio Ponz, in his monumental work Journey around Spain, in which there is significant entry in Vol. X. The work was published in Madrid, about 1781 The (Spanish language) entry concerning the Kingdom of Patones is (approximately interpreted)  as follows:

Places of interest
Patones Arriba is almost exclusively constructed in black slate and provides an important source of information for students of medieval and drystone architecture.

General environment
The lower part of the municipality is agricultural, with cereals, vineyards and olive groves which stretch up-hill. The banks of the river Jarama  a very attractive arboreal landscape  that follows the road to Torrelaguna.

Higher up, rockroses appear, and the northern and eastern facing slopes are commercial pine forest. Above Patones Arriba, in different areas known as eras there are crop terraces once used  for growing rye, pens  for holding livestock (which were mostly goats) and sties for pigs. All of the eras are now abandoned and disused except as marked paths for hill-walkers.  Hunting wild animals is strictly licensed.

Ponton De la Oliva

The Ponton de la Oliva is a reservoir now in disuse. It is the last of six reserves along the course of the river Lozoya and is also its oldest, having been built in 1857 as part of a system of dams and canals supplying  drinking water to the capital.

Canal de Cabarrús
This irrigation channel was constructed between the 16th and 18th centuries. It has a length of 13 kilometers (eight miles), and was the first to be built to irrigate the valley of Uceda from the river Lozoya (and later the Ponton de la Oliva).

Its course runs through the towns of Patones, Torremocha and Torrelaguna. Originally there were six bridges, three aqueducts, eight guardhouses and numerous smaller canals.

It remained in use until the late 19th century, when it was superseded by the more systematic work of the  Canal de Isabel II. A 1.3 km section remains in operation in Patones which is fed from the Canal de la Parra and Atazar Reservoir. The  canal is a Grade 1 (maximum) listed site, with two ancient stone bridges classified at Grade 2 protection. It is also called a canal in Spanish.

The Ermita de la Virgen de la Oliva
The Hermitage, now a ruin under a preservation order, was built for a religious community in about the 12th or 13th century and was attached to the Cathedral Church of Alcala de Henares and now belongs to the successor Diocese of Complutense, based in the same town.

Cueva del Reguerillo
The cave of Reguerillo is the most important archaeological site in the Comunidad Madrid, in terms of both scientific interest and for recreational caving.

Unfortunately, although it has been declared a monument of national interest since 1944, easy access to the cave and its close proximity to the city of Madrid made the cave a recreation center for many groups who were lacking the necessary knowledge and respect for such a site, and the cave became contaminated with trash and graffiti. Accordingly, since 2008 it has been closed to the public by the Directorate General for Heritage in the Community of Madrid, in order to allow the scientific community to perform archaeological and paleontological studies.

It contains three levels of varying difficulty between 78m and 9810m depth. Detailed information can be obtained from the Spanish Wikipedia article.

In 1974 a 2nd-century Celtic Druid encampment was also found nearby.

Public transport 

Patones has three bus lines. One of them has its head at the Plaza de Castilla Interchange. The other two lines communicate Patones with other municipalities in the area

Line 197: Madrid (Plaza de Castilla) -Torrelaguna / Uceda 2 services to Madrid from Monday to Friday and 3 on weekends and holidays. 2 to Uceda from Monday to Friday, 4 weekends and holidays

Line 197A: Torrelaguna-Patones-Uceda 1 towards Uceda and 2 towards Torrelaguna

Line 913: Torrelaguna-El Atazar 3 on weekends and holidays and 9 daily.

Festivities
 La Candelaria (2 February)
 Carnival (before Lent, usually in February)
 Saint Joseph's Day (19 March)
 Saint John's Day (24 June/midsummer)

References

External links

 "De Patones De Arriba Al Pontón De La Oliva" . Retrieved November 8, 2016.
 "Patones - Torrelaguna" . Retrieved November 8, 2016.
 Images. January 2006. Retrieved November 8, 2016.
 Google images.

Statistics 
 Instituto de Estadística de la Comunidad de Madrid > Ficha municipal
 Instituto de Estadística de la Comunidad de Madrid > Series estadísticas del municipio

Street plan, area map and aerial photos 
 Instituto de Estadística de la Comunidad de Madrid > Nomenclátor Oficial y Callejero

auto

Municipalities in the Community of Madrid